Joshua R. Ioane (born 11 July 1995) is a New Zealand rugby union player who plays for Otago in the Mitre 10 Cup and the  in Super Rugby.  His position of choice is fly-half.

Early life
Born in Auckland. Ioane moved to Otago for university, after completing high school at King's College. Ioane was a member of his school’s first XV from years 11 - 13, also representing New Zealand for Touch and Rugby League at school level. Ioane was also eligible to represent Samoa in international rugby through heritage, prior to his All Black debut, having previously represented Samoa U20 in 2015.

Playing career
Ioane was signed to the Highlanders for the 2018 Super Rugby season, having played well in his first season for Otago.

After the departure of established All Black, Lima Sopoaga, from the Highlanders, Ioane became a regular starter for the team during the 2019 Super Rugby season, despite the presence of experienced first-five-eighth, Marty Banks. Ioane was one of the highest points-scorers of the season, with 114 points in the competition.

On 2 July 2019, Ioane was named by head coach Steve Hansen as one of four uncapped players in New Zealand's All Blacks squad for the 2019 Rugby Championship, with utility back Damian McKenzie ruled out for the rest of the year due to a torn ACL. Although named to replace All Black vice-captain Beauden Barrett off the bench against Argentina, Ioane was not brought on to the field, with New Zealand scraping by, winning 20–16.

Having not played any tests during the Rugby Championship, Ioane was left uncapped after the outstanding form of Barrett, as well as Richie Mo'unga. When New Zealand named their squad for the 2019 Rugby World Cup, Ioane was controversially axed, with selectors preferring to take only two first-five-eighths, with Ioane's inexperience deemed to be a risk.

Ioane made his international debut for New Zealand against Tonga on 7 September 2019, having been re-called to prevent injury to Richie Mo'unga. Ioane replaced Beauden Barrett at half-time, scoring 8 points on debut. Ioane's contributions brought New Zealand's points tally to a 92–7 win.

On 31 August 2021, Ioane was signed to the Chiefs for the 2022 Super Rugby Pacific season.

References

External links

1995 births
New Zealand rugby union players
New Zealand sportspeople of Samoan descent
Living people
Rugby union players from Auckland
Rugby union fly-halves
New Zealand international rugby union players
Otago rugby union players
Highlanders (rugby union) players
Moana Pasifika players
Chiefs (rugby union) players
Rugby union fullbacks